Dattatray Balwant Parasnis (1870–1926) was a historian from Maharashtra, India, who lived during the British Raj days.

Parasnis had been granted a lifelong pension of two hundred rupees a month by the Government of Bombay.

Early life
Parasnis was born on 27 November 1870 in a traditional middle-class Deshastha Brahmin family.

Work
Parasnis authored biographies of Bramhendra Swami, Rani's Laxmi Bai of Jhansi and Baija Bai of Gwalior and works on the Mahrattas and the Nawabs of Oudh.

Parasnis also published collections of letters in his two monthly magazines, the Bharatavarsha and the Ithihasa Sangraha, of which the first covered two years and the second seven years from August 1907.

In 1894, Parasnis published an authoritative biography of Maharani Jhansi Lakshmibai, Maharani Laxmibaisaheb Yanche Charitra. His book was based on interviews with Dhanodar Rao, adopted son of Rani Lakshmibai, who was still alive then.

In 1918-1925, along with Charles Augustus Kincaid, he co-authored  in three volumes, A History of the Maratha people.

His Poona in Bygone Times was published in 1921.

Honours
In 1913, he was honoured with the title Rao Bahadur in recognition of his scholarship by the British Government.

Biography and Work
 On Nov 27, 2022, which was his 152nd birthday, a book titled " Rao bahadur D.B.Parasnis - Charitra va Karya " written by Dr. Surendra Shrikrishna Parasnis was published.

References

External links
 
 History of the Maratha People Vol1 Vol2 Vol3

Historians of India
1870 births
1926 deaths
Marathi-language writers
Marathi people
Rai Bahadurs